Buddhu's Tomb ("Buddhū kā muqbara"), also known as Buddhu kā Āwā ("Buddhu's kiln"), is a 17th-century tomb located in Lahore, Pakistan. The tomb is traditionally attributed to that of a Lahore resident named Buddhu, though research suggests the tomb was actually built for the wife of Khan-e-Dauran Bahadur Nusrat Jang. Some Sikhs regard the tomb to be a gurdwara built by Buddhu.

Location
The tomb is located alongside the Grand Trunk Road, east of the Walled City of Lahore. The tomb is situated across the GT Road from the University of Engineering and Technology.

History
The tomb was built around 1641, and is traditionally ascribed to be the tomb of Buddhu, son of Suddhu - a local brick maker who supplied bricks for several royal buildings in Lahore during the Shah Jahan period. Historical record suggests that the tomb was actually built for the wife of Khan-e-Dauran Bahadur Nusrat Jang - an amir of the Mughal royal court. The amir was himself was later buried in it following his death in 1643. 

In keeping with Mughal funerary tradition, the tomb was likely located in a garden which no longer survives. The site was used by Prince Sher Singh as his army's headquarters during his invasion of Lahore.

Architecture

The base level of the tomb is square shaped, and has an doorway in each side. Each doorway is flanked by a small recessed arch. Atop the base is an octagonal layer upon which the tomb's prominent dome is placed, measuring 32 feet in diameter.

The tomb is decorated with glazed blue and yellow tile-work, laid primarily in floral designs. The tomb's dome is decorated with blue tile-work in a chevron pattern.

Associated legend
The tomb has traditionally be ascribed to be the brick-kiln of Buddhu. Buddhu's servants are said to have refused Abdul Haq, a disciple of Mian Mir, from warming himself at the brick kiln. Haq cursed the kiln, leading to its eventual decline. Buddhu was forced to atone for his sin, but the insult was considered so great that the kiln remained out of service thereafter. 

A Sikh version of the legend asserts that Buddhu had refused to feed Bhai Kamliya, and was later cursed by him until Buddhu was able to repent to Guru Arjan before his business was restored. Sikhs assert that the tomb was actually built as part of a gurdwara.

Conservation
The site is protected by the Antiquities Act 1975. The site was partially restored in 2014 by Dr. Abdul Rehman, with support from an alumni fund for Fulbright scholars, and The United States Educational Foundation in Pakistan.

Impact of Metro construction
The monument is situated along the planned route of the Orange Line of the Lahore Metro. Heritage campaigners submitted a petition to the Lahore High Court as the planned metro line will pass close to Buddhu's Tomb, the Shalimar Gardens, and nine other sites in the city in violation of the Punjab Special Premises Ordinance, 1985 and Antiquity Act, 1975.

Gallery

References 

Lahore
Mughal tombs
Architecture of Lahore
Buildings and structures in Lahore
Tourist attractions in Lahore
Islamic architecture
Indo-Islamic architecture